The 2011 GEICO 400 was a NASCAR Sprint Cup Series stock car race that was scheduled to be held on September 18, 2011 at Chicagoland Speedway in Joliet, Illinois. However, because of wet track conditions, the race was postponed until September 19, 2011. Contested over 267 laps on the 1.500-mile (2.414 km) asphalt oval, it was the 27th race of the 2011 Sprint Cup Series season, as well as the first race in the ten-race Chase for the Sprint Cup, which ends the season.  Tony Stewart of Stewart Haas Racing won the race, while Kevin Harvick finished second, and Dale Earnhardt Jr. clinched third.

This was Stewart's first win in the 2011 season, and the 40th of his career. The result advanced Stewart to second in the Drivers' Championship, seven points behind Harvick and three ahead of Carl Edwards. Chevrolet maintained its lead in the Manufacturers' Championship, thirty points ahead of Ford and thirty-eight ahead of Toyota, with nine races remaining in the season.  A total of 95,000 people attended the race, while 3.68 million watched it on television.

Report

Background

Chicagoland Speedway is one of ten intermediate to hold NASCAR races; the others are Atlanta Motor Speedway, Kansas Speedway, Charlotte Motor Speedway, Darlington Raceway, Homestead Miami Speedway, New Hampshire Motor Speedway, Kentucky Speedway, Las Vegas Motor Speedway, and Texas Motor Speedway. The track's turns are each banked at 18 degrees and have a turn width of 55 feet. The racetrack has a grandstand capacity of 75,000.

Before the race, Kyle Busch and Kevin Harvick each led the Drivers' Championship with 2,012 points, with Jeff Gordon in third place with 2,009. Matt Kenseth had a total of 2,006 points, while Carl Edwards and Jimmie Johnson, Kurt Busch, and Ryan Newman were tied for fifth place with 2,003 points. Tony Stewart, Dale Earnhardt Jr., Brad Keselowski, and Denny Hamlin rounded out the first 12 positions with 2,000 points each. In the Manufacturers' Championship, Chevrolet was leading with 171 points, 27 points ahead of Ford. Toyota, with 139 points, was 21 points ahead of Dodge in the battle for third place. David Reutimann was the race's defending champion.

Practice and qualifying

Two practice sessions were held in preparation for the race; both on Friday. The first session lasted 90 minutes long, while the second was 60 minutes long. Reutimann was quickest with a time of 29.486 seconds in the first session, 0.028 seconds faster than Clint Bowyer. Mark Martin was just off Bowyer's pace, followed by Kyle Busch, Trevor Bayne, and Newman. Some Chase for the Sprint Cup participants were not scored high in the first practice, such as Johnson and Hamlin, who were 36th and 40th in the session.

In the second and final practice, Brian Vickers was quickest with a time of 29.304 seconds. Kasey Kahne followed in second, ahead of Kenseth and Paul Menard. Harvick was fifth quickest, with a time of 29.455 seconds. Gordon, Greg Biffle, Johnson, David Stremme, and Edwards rounded out the first ten positions. Kyle Busch, who was third in the first session, could only manage forty-fourth.

Forty-seven cars were entered for qualifying, but only forty-three could race because of NASCAR's qualifying procedure. Kenseth clinched his sixth pole position in the Sprint Cup Series, with a time of 29.469 seconds. He was joined on the front row of the grid by Menard. Kurt Busch qualified third, Newman took fourth, and Edwards started fifth. Johnson, one of the drivers in the Chase for the Sprint Cup, qualified twelfth, while Harvick was scored thirtieth. The four drivers that failed to qualify for the race were Travis Kvapil, David Starr, Stephen Leicht and Mike Skinner (T. J. Bell was gonna enter the race but withdrew).

Once qualifying concluded Kenseth said, "I think starting up front is nice, having a good pit stall. Hopefully, you can get a good start and get a bonus point for leading a lap and try to keep up with the track a little better. We've been qualifying a lot better, if you throw Richmond out, but we've been slipping a little at the end of the race. I'm really happy to be on the pole, but it's just a starting position, and we've got to work really hard on the race, keeping up with our adjustments and that type of thing."

Race
The race, the twenty-seventh of the season, was scheduled to begin at 2:00 p.m. EDT on September 18, but wet track conditions postponed the race to September 19, 2011 at 12:00 p.m. EDT. The race was televised live in the United States on ESPN. The first caution was the competition caution on lap 31. The next 2 cautions came out for debris on laps 72 and 146. The 4th caution came out on lap 165 when Jamie McMurray blew an engine. On lap 205, the 5th caution came out when J. J. Yeley crashed in turn 3. The final caution came out for debris on lap 214. Towards the end of the race, a majority of cars ran out of fuel. Tony Stewart was able to hold on for his first win of the season.

Results

Qualifying

Race results

Standings after the race

Drivers' Championship standings

Manufacturers' Championship standings

Note: Only the top twelve positions are included for the driver standings.

References

GEICO 400
GEICO 400
NASCAR races at Chicagoland Speedway
September 2011 sports events in the United States